Marriage in Cambodia is a social institution which structures Khmer society. The Khmer wedding, with its long history and rich symbolism, is also famous for its specific music, known as phleng kar.

The wedding usually lasts for a day and a half. It starts at the bride's home followed by a religious ceremony and exchange of ritual gifts. The garments worn are covered with jewelry as a mark of respect to the parents of bride and groom, and all the couple's relatives and friends are present. The parents offer blessings and the couple prays to the monks for a happy life. In theory, marriage is monogamic and for life.

History

Origin: symbolic reenactment of the legendary wedding of Preah Thong and Neang Neak 

Cambodian brides and grooms reenact in each traditional Khmer wedding because wedding rituals symbolize the marriage of Preah Thaong and his bride Neang Neak. This explains many Khmer wedding customs, in which the groom carries the bride's scarf, symbolizing that he is from afar and is marrying into her family, in contrast to Indian wedding customs where the bride holds the groom's scarf. The bride and groom wear garments decorated with jewelry and are surrounded by family and guests. The couple's garments are a sign of respect to their parents and parents-in-law, both of whom offer their blessings to the couple.

Development of the Khmer wedding rite 
Across centuries, the Cambodian rite of marriage developed and integrated various elements which reflect its long history.

Ethnological study of the Khmer wedding 
The earliest academic reference to wedding rites in Cambodia was made by French ethnologist Paul Pelliot of the French School of the Far East in 1903 with accounts of customs in the thirteenth century by Chinese diplomat Zhou Daguan.

The first extensive description of the Khmer wedding was published in 1920 by French colonialist Arthur Daguin.

In 1965, Venerable Nhiek Nou, a monk of the Dhammayut order, published a booklet entitled Kpuon Abah-bibah or the Treaty concerning Marriage. It contains four parts, the first two pertaining with the rituals of Khmer weddings for the royal family as for the commoners. It also reprimanded younger generations for adopting Western traditions during the celebration of weddings in Cambodia.

Khmers Rouges: the tragedy of forced marriages 
During the Civil War in Cambodia, a Cambodian wedding party was mistakenly razed by B-52s. It was the beginning of a tragic period of Khmer weddings.

The Khmer Rouge divided families and separated the men from the women. The father, mother, and children frequently were separated for many months. A man and woman often did not have time to consummate a marriage, and sexual relations were limited by long separations. Extramarital relations and even flirtations between young people were heavily punished.

Descriptions of newlywed couples being spied on by secret soldiers on their wedding night to ensure sexual intercourse has been recorded.

The modern Khmer wedding 
Since the 1990s, although many Cambodians insist that the proper Khmer wedding ceremony should be a three-day event, most Khmer weddings in Phnom Penh are held on a single day. Because of this simplification, a large proportion of the traditional music which used to accompany the celebration has fallen out of use or been completely lost.

Some have been critical of the current trend of exaggerated expenses of Khmer people, especially in the Khmer diaspora, with the belief of the wedding's success being determined monetarily.

Ritual

Royal wedding 
Members of the royal family and dignitaries of the palace and their children are entitled to this type of wedding of ancient tradition. The ceremony set of rules dictated by a Royal Ordinance promulgated on March 14, 1909. The main feature was the royal blessing which the King offered to the newlyweds in their fanciest attire by pouring blessed water and throwing flower petals at them.

The royal weddings were a three-day event that took place within the walls of the Royal Palace. On the first day, 19 monks, reminiscent of the 19 souls in the Khmer tradition, were invited to celebrate the paritta before offerings were made to the spirits and the popil were rotated. A banquet was then organized in the Palace gardens. On the second day, the King would extend his blessing with Brahmanical holy water after the spouses protestrated themselves three times before his majesty. The bakus would sound their conch horns in celebration.

Ordinary wedding 
Customs vary as between rural and urban areas, with many city dwellers being influenced by western ideas.  The choice of a spouse is usually undertaken by the families of young men and women, sometimes with the help of a matchmaker.   
A man usually marries between the ages of nineteen and twenty-five and a girl between sixteen and twenty-two. 

The traditional wedding is a long and colorful affair. The traditional Khmer wedding originally lasted seven days and seven nights. Later, it was reduced to three days and three nights, but by the 1980s it more commonly lasted a day and a half. The ceremony begins in the morning at the home of the bride and is directed by the achar. Buddhist priests offer a short sermon and recite prayers of blessing. Parts of the ceremony involve ritual hair cutting and tying cotton threads soaked in holy water around the couple's wrists.

In the traditional Khmer wedding ceremony, before the groom enters the house to meet his bride, he kneels and pays homage to the east where the sun rises.

The rite in which participants in a reciprocal relationship "tie the hands" (chang dai) of the bridal couple by making a monetary gift signifies their bond to the newlyweds and their families, as a forme of exchange to promote solidarity and mutual obligation.

Variants 
There are some similarities in the wedding among the Souy and Khmer wedding . Meanwhile, there are also differences, especially concerning the dowry.

Music: phleng kar 
The Khmer wedding has traditionally been a prominent occasion for music, and wedding music known as phleng kar developed over the centuries.

In the olden days, the traditional Khmer wedding ensemble known as vung phleng kar or vung phleng Khmer was restricted to be played by only old serious male musicians.

The vung phleng kar, which is the most popular of all Khmer music ensembles, can be found in virtually every village, town and city in Cambodia and even in Khmer refugee communities in the United States. The original instrumentation with a leaf (sleuk), a double-reed pipe (prey prebaub, which served as a tuning standard for the ensemble), a musical bow or ksaedieu, a three-stringed fiddle or tro khmer, a long-necked lute or chapei and a vocalist.

The Preah Thaong melody played during Khmer wedding ceremonies is considered sacred. The plheng kar is used in all Khmer weddings, mostly Buddhists, but the texts have also been adapted by Khmer Christians for the celebration of the sacrament of marriage in Christian churches.

The importance of live music in a Khmer wedding is still true in the 21st century: while the funeral music is often recorded, the wedding ritual will always be live. Khmer wedding music is supplied by a hired traditional band that, for much of the ceremony, remains separated from the core ritual action of the ceremony.  Guests and main participants of the ceremony do not sing or dance, nor do they exercise an influence on the repertoire performed.

However, in recent years, modern bands and DJs have also become popular at Khmer weddings.

Gastronomy 
In the ceremonial of the Khmer wedding, Khmers will bake the Num anssam chrouk, with pork meat, and Num anssam chek , made with banana, as thy usually do for major religious ceremonies such as Pchum Ben or the Khmer New Year.

Filmography 
Khmer films of colonial and post-colonial era in Cambodia offer examples of the proper traditional attire for Khmer weddings.

References

Bibliography
 
 
 

Cambodian culture
Sexuality in Cambodia
Cambodia
Cambodia